Hütten may refer to:

Hütten, Rhineland-Palatinate, a municipality in Rhineland-Palatinate, Germany
Hütten, Schleswig-Holstein, a municipality in Schleswig-Holstein, Germany
Hütten, Switzerland, a municipality in the canton of Zürich
Hütten (Amt), a former collective municipality in Schleswig-Holstein, Germany